Hall is an unincorporated community in Granite County, Montana, United States. The community has a post office with ZIP code 59837.

Originally called Hall's Crossing, the Northern Pacific Railroad constructed a branch line across this land in 1877.

Demographics

References

Unincorporated communities in Granite County, Montana
Unincorporated communities in Montana